Dingli Swallows Football Club is a Maltese football club from the small village of Ħad-Dingli, which currently plays in the Maltese National Amateur League. The club was founded in 1948.

History
In the 2008–09 season the club won the Maltese First Division gaining promotion to Maltese Premier League for the first time in their history. In their first season they finished bottom of the league and were relegated back down.

Current squad

Source:

 (Club prod.)
 (Club prod.)

 (Club prod.)
 (Club prod.)
 (Club prod.)

 (Club Captain)

 (Club prod.)

Club officials and coaching staff

Club officials
Source:

 President: Joseph Cuschieri
 Vice President: Shawn Tanti
 Secretary: Brendan Tanti
 Treasurer: Rigovert Casha

Honours
 Maltese First Division: 2008–09

References

External links
 https://www.mfa.com.mt/en/leagues/leagues/93/bov-amateur-league-c.htm?feature=teams&mp=175

Dingli Swallows F.C.
Football clubs in Malta
Association football clubs established in 1948
1948 establishments in Malta